Andrei Borisovich Rezantsev (born 15 October 1965) is a former Uzbekistani professional footballer.

Club career
He made his professional debut in the Soviet Second League in 1983 for Neftyanik Fergana.

He played on five different teams managed by Aleksandr Averyanov.

Honours
 Uzbek League champion: 1992.

References

1963 births
People from Torez
Living people
Russian footballers
Soviet footballers
Uzbekistani footballers
Association football defenders
Uzbekistani people of Russian descent
Uzbekistan international footballers
Russian Premier League players
FC Okean Nakhodka players
PFC Krylia Sovetov Samara players
FC Shinnik Yaroslavl players
FC Lada-Tolyatti players
FC Spartak-UGP Anapa players
Footballers at the 1998 Asian Games
Asian Games competitors for Uzbekistan